Ali Abadak (also Romanized as ‘Alī Ābādak and Alīābādak; also known as ‘Alīābād) is a village in Jolgeh Rural District Rural District, Shahrabad District, Bardaskan County, Razavi Khorasan Province, Iran. At the 2006 census, its population was 496, in 130 families.

References 

Populated places in Bardaskan County